Black Thrash Attack is the first studio album by the Norwegian black metal band Aura Noir. This is the first album to feature Blasphemer (Rune Eriksen) from Mayhem on guitars. As indicated in the title, this album is a mix of black metal and thrash metal and as such contains quite a few hints at early German thrash bands such as Kreator and Destruction.

All songs by Aura Noir. Track 7 co-written by Aldrahn of Dødheimsgard.

Track listing
"Sons of Hades" – 3:31
"Conqueror" – 4:03
"Caged Wrath" – 5:28
"Wretched Face of Evil" – 4:11
"Black Thrash Attack" – 5:11
"The Pest" – 3:11
"The One Who Smite" – 4:07
"Eternally Your Shadow" – 3:36
"Destructor" – 4:41
"Fighting for Hell" – 4:10

Credits
Aggressor - Guitars, Bass, Drums, Vocals
Apollyon - Guitars, Bass, Drums, Vocals
Blasphemer - Guitars

References

1996 albums
Aura Noir albums